The Ohara Dam is a gravity dam on the Shō River in Ohara village about  south of Nanto in Toyama Prefecture, Japan. It was constructed between 1939 and 1942. The dam has an associated 97.6 MW hydroelectric power station which was built in two parts. The first part of the power station (51.3 MW) was commissioned in 1942 and the second part of the power station (46.3 MW) was commissioned in 1980. Of the nine dams on the Shō River it is the fourth furthest downstream.

See also

Soyama Dam – downstream
Akao Dam – upstream

References

Dams in Toyama Prefecture
Gravity dams
Dams completed in 1942
Dams on the Shō River
Hydroelectric power stations in Japan
1942 establishments in Japan